Aditi is a Vedic goddess in Hinduism, the personification of the infinite.

Aditi may also refer to:

People 

 Aditi Arya, Indian actress, born 1993
 Aditi Bhatia, Indian actress and model, born 1999
 Aditi Govitrikar, Indian model, actress and a doctor, born 1976
 Aditi Kapil, American playwright
 Aditi Jaltare, Indian child actress, born 2010
 Aditi Prabhudeva, Indian film actress
 Aditi Rao Hydari, Indian actress, dancer and singer, born 1983
 Aditi Rathore, Indian television actress
 Aditi Sajwan, Indian television actress, born 1992
 Aditi Sharma (actress, born 1983), Indian film and TV actress
 Aditi Sharma (actress, born 1996), Indian television actress
 Aditi Sharma (cricketer), Indian cricketer
 Aditi Singh Sharma, Indian playback singer

Company 
 Aditi Technologies is an American IT company